Sister Angelica may refer to:

Suor Angelica, an opera in one act by Giacomo Puccini
Sister Angelica (film), a 1954 Spanish drama film
Glen Ruth, a previous name for the professional wrestler